Mascaron  may refer to:

 Mascaron (architecture), a decorative element in the form of a sculpted face or head of a human being or an animal
 Jules Mascaron, French preacher 

Surnames of French origin